Waltzin' with Flo is the only solo album by jazz drummer Alan Dawson. Although it was recorded in 1992, it wasn't released until 2002, six years after his death in 1996 from leukemia. Ken Dryden of Rovi says (in a review), "Not only is Dawson's matchless drumming a key component of this CD, he records several of his compositions and arrangements, and he also plays vibes on two tracks".

Track listing
Penta Blues
Airegin
Two Stepped
Waltz for Flo
1993 A.D.
Little Man You've Had a Busy Day
Havana Days
Old Devil Moon
Joshua

Personnel
Alan Dawson: drums, vibraphone
Tony Reedus: drums
Ray Drummond: bass
James Williams or Donald Brown: piano
Bill Mobley: trumpet, flugelhorn
Bill Pierce: tenor saxophone
Andy McGhee: tenor saxophone

References

2002 debut albums
Jazz albums by American artists